A Knight of the Range is a 1916 American Western film, featuring Harry Carey.

Cast
 Harry Carey as Cheyenne Harry
 Olive Carey as Bess Dawson
 Hoot Gibson as Bob Graham
 William Canfield as Gentleman Dick
 Bud Osborne as Sheriff
 A. D. Blake as Nick
 William Steele as Burk (as Bill Gettinger)
 Peggy Coudray as Dolores

See also
 Harry Carey filmography
 Hoot Gibson filmography

References

External links
 

1916 films
1916 Western (genre) films
American black-and-white films
Films directed by Jacques Jaccard
Universal Pictures films
Silent American Western (genre) films
1910s American films
1910s English-language films